Brian Wood may refer to:

Brian Wood (comics) (born 1972), writer for graphic novels, video games, and television
Brian Wood (footballer) (1940–2014), former professional footballer
Brian Wood (artist) (born 1948), artist and photographer
Brian Wood (journalist), television news anchor and reporter
Brian Wood (British Army soldier)

See also
Bryan Wood (born 1954), Australian rules footballer
Bryan Wood (curler) (born 1944), Canadian curler
Brian Woods (disambiguation)